Awakening is the third full-length studio release from drummer/songwriter/producer Narada Michael Walden.  It was the first of two 1979 releases for the artist and featured him (once again) writing all the songs, though he co-produced each track with someone else.

Track listing
All songs written and arranged by Narada Michael Walden.
"Love Me Only" 6:05
"I Don't Want Nobody Else (To Dance with You)" 4:24
"Give Your Love a Chance" 4:11
"They Want the Feeling" 3:58
"Awakening Suite Part I: Childhood-Opening of the Heart" 3:28
"The Awakening" 4:30
"Listen to Me" 4:54
"Full and Satisfied" 3:35
"Will You Ever Know" 4:59

Personnel
Narada Michael Walden - drums, percussion, acoustic piano, organ, "dream bass"
Kenny Mazur, Hiram Bullock, Jay Graydon, Ray Gomez, Pat Thrall, Carlos Santana, Steve Beckmeier - guitars
Cliff Carter - Moog, Fender Rhodes, Clavinet, Synthesized Bass
Greg Phillinganes - keyboards, electric piano
Sonny Burke - acoustic piano, synthesizers
Bobby Lyle - keyboards
Michael Boddicker, Pat Adams - synthesizers
Norbert Sloley, Keni Burke, Nate Phillips - bass
Victor Feldman - percussion
Don Menza, Pete Christlieb - flute
Orchestra on "The Awakening" arranged by Jorge del Barrio
Horns Arranged by Randy Brecker (trumpet)
George Young - alto saxophone; Michael Brecker - tenor saxophone; David Duke, James Decker - French horn

Production
Produced by Narada Michael Walden (all tracks), Patrick Adams (co-producer; tracks 1-4), Sonny Burke (track 5-7) & Wayne Henderson (track 8 & 9)
Recording Engineers: Bob Clearmountain (tracks 1-4), Jimmy Schfflett (tracks 5-7) & Alan Sides (tracks 8-9)
Vocals on "Love Me Only" and "They Want the Feeling" recorded by Michael Frondelli at Electric Lady
Tracks 1-4 recorded at The Power Station; Tracks 5-9 recorded at Crystal Sound
Mixed by Bob Clearmountain (tracks 1-4 & 9) & Alan Sides (tracks 5-8)
Mastered by Dennis King

References

External links
Allmusic review 
Awakening at Discogs.com

1979 albums
Atlantic Records albums
Albums produced by Narada Michael Walden
Albums produced by Wayne Henderson (musician)
Narada Michael Walden albums